Cicindela patruela, commonly known as northern barrens tiger beetle is a species of tiger beetle from the subfamily Cicindelinae. It is native to Ontario where it lives two years in sands and flies in late May. In June, the species lay eggs which hatch next month.

Distribution and habitat
C. patruela is found in eastern North America from Minnesota to Massachusetts and Georgia to Quebec where it lives in grained sand or sandstone, talus deposits and various forests which have oak trees, or lichen and moss grounds.

References

External links
Cicindela patruela on Bug Guide

patruela
Beetles of North America